Donald Gray Triplett (born September 8, 1933) is an American man known for being the first person diagnosed with autism. He was first diagnosed by Leo Kanner, and was labeled as "Case 1". Triplett was noted for his savant abilities, particularly the ability to name musical notes played on a piano, and the ability to perform rapid mental multiplication.

Early life

Donald Triplett was born to Beamon and Mary Triplett. Initially, Donald was a deeply introverted child who did not respond to his parents' gestures or voices. His language was unusual, he did not play with other children, and he seemed distant from others. Triplett was institutionalized at three years of age, but his parents pulled him out one year later. His father, Beamon, described him as socially withdrawn but interested in number patterns, music notes, letters of the alphabet, and U.S. president pictures. At the age of 1, Kanner states "he could hum and sing many tunes accurately." His parents had great difficulty in getting him to eat and watching other children eating candy or ice cream did not seem to tempt him. By the age of 2, he had the ability to recite the 23rd Psalm in the Old Testament and memorized 25 questions and answers from some unspecified Presbyterian catechism (likely either the Westminster Larger or Shorter Catechism). He was also interested in creating musical chords. He was very interested in rhymes and would answer questions with only one word, usually "yes" or "no." At this age, he developed a very intense interest in spinning blocks, pans and other round objects and a dislike for tricycles and swings. He was initially uninterested in slides but began to play on them when he was alone. He had many meltdowns and was afraid of being spanked. He was however, unable to associate his meltdowns with the punishment. He displayed echolalia and had trouble with remembering pronouns, often using "you" to refer to himself and "I" to refer to the person he was speaking to. When entering a room, he went to the toys right away ignoring everyone else in the room, including other children and a Santa Claus actor his father had hired. His mother had difficulty with getting him to look at her.

When the Tripletts went to Baltimore, Maryland to meet with Leo Kanner, he was eventually diagnosed with autism. Donald had multiple visits but when he returned he did not even look at the three physicians present, even though two remembered him from the previous visit. He instead headed to the desk to handle papers and books. Kanner started conversations to view his "obsessive nature." He also asked him subtraction questions to which Donald peculiarly replied "I'll draw a hexagon." When he returned home, his behavior seemingly improved and he learned to play simple tunes on the piano. He showed better concentration and responded more clearly to his environment and other people. However, he still had autistic meltdowns [referred to at the time as "temper tantrums" when there was very little understood about ASD] and displayed some disconcerting behavior such as standing on tables, putting food in his hair, chewing on paper and putting house keys in the drain. He learned fifteen words from an encyclopedia and repeated them over and over without context. He continued to not look at people when talking or use expressive gestures. He communicated only when he needed something. His interest dissipated once he was given or told what he needed. He became interested in categorizing films and Time magazine issues by date of publication despite having little interest in the actual contents.

Education and adult life

The diagnosis of Donald Triplett would lead to the complex history of autism, which involved many conflicts among autism personnel and advocates.

However, Donald Triplett and his family were distant from all this. He was enrolled in the local high school, where his teachers and classmates were accepting, and in 1958 he graduated with a Bachelor's degree in French from Millsaps College.  Later, he returned to his supportive hometown where he worked at the bank that was owned by his family.  He learned how to drive and travel around the world in his spare time.

Legacy

Triplett was tracked down by John Donvan and Caren Zucker so they could find out his life's story for an article "Autism's First Child" in The Atlantic.  He was later featured in the book In a Different Key.

References

External links
  Leo Kanner's full case study on Donald Triplett

American people with disabilities
People on the autism spectrum
People from Forest, Mississippi
Millsaps College alumni
1933 births
Living people
Autistic savants